Koya University is a public university located in Koy Sanjaq, near Erbil (Hewlêr), capital of the Erbil Governorate in the Iraqi Kurdistan region of Iraq. It was established in 2003.

History
The Kurdistan Regional Government opened colleges of Education and Sharia and Law during the academic year 2000–2001 in Koya, that were affiliated with University of Sulaymaniyah. Later, they became the foundation of Koya University.

Koya University was established at the beginning of the academic year 2003–2004. The first graduation session of Koya University was held on July, 20th, 2006.

Colleges
In 2010, Koya University was restructured from colleges to faculty systems to enhance the interactions between similar academic fields. Today the University has four faculties and 25 departments in different fields.

The educational programmes include both bachelor's and master's degree and doctoral programmes.
 Faculty of Engineering (FENG)
 Faculty of Science and Health (FSCH)
 Faculty of Humanity and Social Science (FHSS)
 Faculty of Education (FEDU)
In January 2017, Koya University opened an English teaching center. As of 2019, Koya University has 440 academic staff.

References

External links 
 

Universities in Kurdistan Region (Iraq)
Koy Sanjaq
Erbil Governorate
Public universities
Educational institutions established in 2003
2003 establishments in Iraqi Kurdistan